PKU can refer to:

 Phenylketonuria, a genetic disease
 Peking University, Beijing, China
 Pku, an Armenian musical instrument
 Sultan Syarif Kasim II International Airport, Pekanbaru, Riau, Indonesia, IATA code